Geositta is a genus of passerine birds in the ovenbird family, Furnariidae. They are known as miners (not to be confused with the unrelated miners, Manorina, of Australia) due to the tunnels they dig for nesting. There are 11 species including the campo miner (Geositta poeciloptera) which was formerly classified in a genus of its own, Geobates. They inhabit open country in South America, particularly the Andean and Patagonian regions. They are ground-dwelling birds, somewhat resembling the larks and wheatears of other continents. They are mostly drab brown in coloration and often have a fairly long and slender bill.

Species list
The genus contains 11 species:

References

Jaramillo, Alvaro; Burke, Peter & Beadle, David (2003) Field Guide to the Birds of Chile, Christopher Helm, London
South American Classification Committee (2007) A classification of the bird species of South America, part 6. Retrieved 08/06/07.

 
Bird genera